The Xingkang Bridge or Luding Yaye Expressway Bridge as is a suspension bridge in Luding County, Sichuan, China that opened in 2018. The bridge forms part of the G4218 Ya'an–Kargilik Expressway carrying traffic over the Dadu River. The bridge began construction in 2014 and opened in 2018. The main span of the bridge is  making it one of the longest ever built.

The bridge is located just 2 kilometres upstream from the Luding Dam and crosses the reservoir formed by the dam. Although the bridge is 285 metres above the original river the bridge sits 235 metres above the reservoir. The bridge was constructed as part of the new expressway from Ya'an to Kangding massively reducing travel times in the area.

See also
 List of bridges in China
 List of highest bridges in the world
 List of longest suspension bridge spans
 Luding Bridge

External links
http://www.highestbridges.com/wiki/index.php?title=Daduhe_Bridge_Xingkang

References

http://www.chinadaily.com.cn/china/2017-04/06/content_28815397.htm

Bridges in Sichuan
Suspension bridges in China
Bridges completed in 2018